Television Playwright is a British television anthology series which aired from 1958 to 1959 on the BBC. Of the 29 episodes, only three are known to survive  as early examples of British television drama.

References

External links

1950s British drama television series
1958 British television series debuts
1959 British television series endings
1950s British anthology television series
Black-and-white British television shows
BBC television dramas
Lost BBC episodes
English-language television shows